Agapanthia cretica is a species of beetle in the family Cerambycidae. It was described by Bernhauer in 1978.

References

cretica
Beetles described in 1978